Dirty Head is a summit in Franklin County, Idaho and Cache County, Utah, in the United States.

References

Mountains of Franklin County, Idaho
Mountains of Cache County, Utah
Mountains of Idaho
Mountains of Utah